Jesse Reynolds Pike (September 17, 1890 – October 22, 1986) was an American cyclist. He competed in two events at the 1912 Summer Olympics.

References

External links
 

1890 births
1986 deaths
American male cyclists
Olympic cyclists of the United States
Cyclists at the 1912 Summer Olympics
People from North Bergen, New Jersey
Sportspeople from Bergen County, New Jersey